Icoana may refer to the following places in Romania:

 Icoana, a commune in Olt County
 Icoana, a village in the commune Ulmi, Giurgiu County
 Icoana, a tributary of the river Ața in Neamț County
 Icoana, a tributary of the river Nemțișor in Neamț County